is a Japanese karateka, professional kickboxer and the current K-1 Lightweight champion.

As of March 2022 he was the #2 ranked super bantamweight (-64 kg) kickboxer in the world by Combat Press, while Beyond Kick ranks him as the world's best featherweight (-64 kg) as of October 2022.

Professional career

Early career

Career beginnings
Yoza made his professional kickboxing debut against Masahiro Kojika at Japanese Kickboxing Innovation Join Forces 12 on March 31, 2019. He won the fight by a third-round technical knockout, after knocking Kojika down three times by the 2:38 minute mark. Yoza faced Tatsuro Fukui at Japanese Kickboxing Innovation Join Forces 13 on May 19, 2019. He won the fight by a third-round technical knockout. The ringside physician was called in at the very end of the round, due to a cut on Fukui's face, who advised the referee to stop the fight.

Yoza made his promotional debut with REBELS against Yoshiki at REBELS 61 on June 9, 2019. He won the fight by split decision. Two of the judges scored the fight 30–28 and 29–28 in his favor, while the third judge scored the fight 29–28 for Yoshiki.

Yoza was booked to face Volcano Imoto at Japanese Kickboxing Innovation Join Forces 14 on July 15, 2019. He knocked Imoto out with a head kick at the 2:30 minute mark of the first round.

Yoza faced Johnny Oliveira at K.O CLIMAX 2019 on August 18, 2019. He won the fight by unanimous decision, with scores of 29–28, 30–29 and 30–28. Yoza faced Tereka∞ at REBELS 63×KNOCK OUT on October 6, 2019. He won the fight by unanimous decision, with all three judges awarding him a 30–26 scorecard. Yoza scored the sole knockdown of the fight late in the third round, flooring Tereka with a left hook.

Yoza faced Tatsuya Inaishi at SNKA SOUL IN THE RING CLIMAX on December 8, 2019. He won the fight by majority decision.

KNOCK OUT tournaments
On December 23, 2019, it was announced that Yoza would participate in the 2020 KNOCK OUT 64kg Grand Prix. Yoza was booked to face Chihiro Suzuki in the tournament quarterfinals, which were held on February 11, 2020. He lost the fight by majority decision. Two of the judges scored the bout 29–28 for Suzuki, while the third judge scored it as an even 28–28 draw.

After suffering his first professional loss, Yoza was booked to face Masaya Kubo at REBELS 67 on November 8, 2020. He won the fight by majority decision, with scores of 30–29, 30–29 and 29–28. Yoza next faced Tomo Kiire at Japan Kickboxing Innovation Champions Carnival 2020 on December 27, 2020. He won the fight by a third-round knockout.

On January 29, 2021, it was revealed that Yoza would take part in the 2021 KNOCK OUT super lightweight BLACK tournament. Yoza was scheduled to face Keijiro Miyakoshi in the semifinals, which were held on March 13, 2021. He lost the fight by split decision, after an extra round was fought.

K-1

Early promotional career
Yoza made his K-1 debut against Hikaru Hasumi at Krush 132 on December 18, 2021. He won the fight by a second-round knockout, stopping Hikaru with a head kick 17 seconds into the round.

Yoza was booked to face the K-1 Lightweight champion Taio Asahisa in a non-title bout at K-1 World GP 2022 Japan on February 27, 2022. He won the fight by unanimous decision, after an extension round fought. Yoza called for a title fight with Asahisa in his post-fight interview.

Following his upset defeat of Asahisa, Yoza faced the former Krush Super Lightweight champion Yuto Shinohara in a lightweight bout at K-1 World GP 2022 in Fukuoka on August 11, 2022. He won the fight by a second-round knockout, stopping Shinohara with low kicks.

Yoza faced the former Rajadamnern Stadium super lightweight champion Aikpikart Mor.Krungthepthonburi at K-1 World GP 2022 in Osaka on December 3, 2022. He won the fight by unanimous decision, with all three judges awarding him every round of the bout.

Lightweight champion
Yoza was booked to challenge Taio Asahisa for the K-1 Lightweight Championship at K-1 World GP 2023: K'Festa 6 on March 12, 2023. He won the fight by unanimous decision, with two scorecards of 30–29 and one scorecard of 30–28.

Titles and accomplishments

Kickboxing
Professional
K-1
2023 K-1 Lightweight (-62.5 kg) Championship
Awards
eFight.jp
Fighter of the Month (February 2022)
Beyond Kickboxing
2022 Beyond Kick "Breakthrough Fighter of the Year"

Karate
IKO Kyokushinkaikan
 2012 International Youth (U-15) Championships -55kg 3rd place
 2013 All Japan High School (U-15) Championships -65kg Winner
 2013 International Youth (U-15) Championships -65kg Winner
 2014 World Youth Elite (U-18) Championships -65kg runner-up
 2014 All Japan Weight Championships -70kg 4th place
 2015 World Youth Elite (U-18) Championships - 65kg runner-up
 2015 All Japan Weight Championships -70kg 3rd place
 2016 All Japan Weight Championships -70kg Winner
 2017 World Weight Championships -70kg Winner
 2018 All Japan Weight Championships -80kg Runner-up

Fight record

|-  style="background:#cfc"
| 2023-03-12 || Win ||align=left| Taio Asahisa || K-1 World GP 2023: K'Festa 6 || Tokyo, Japan || Decision (Unanimous) || 3 || 3:00 
|-
! style=background:white colspan=9 |
|-
|-  style="background:#cfc"
| 2022-12-03|| Win ||align=left| Aikpikart Mor.Krungthepthonburi ||  K-1 World GP 2022 in Osaka || Osaka, Japan || Decision (Unanimous) || 3 || 3:00 

|-  style="background:#cfc"
| 2022-08-11|| Win ||align=left| Yuto Shinohara ||  K-1 World GP 2022 in Fukuoka || Fukuoka, Japan || TKO (Low kicks)|| 2 ||1:12
|-
|-  style="background:#cfc"
| 2022-02-27||Win ||align=left| Taio Asahisa ||  K-1 World GP 2022 Japan || Tokyo, Japan || Ext.R Decision (Unanimous)  || 4 || 3:00
|-  style="background:#cfc"
| 2021-12-18 || Win || align=left| Hikaru Hasumi || Krush 132 || Tokyo, Japan || KO (Left High kick) || 2 || 0:17
|-  style="background:#fbb;"
| 2021-03-13|| Loss ||align=left| Keijiro Miyakoshi || KNOCK OUT ～The REBORN～ 65kg Black Championship Tournament, Semi Final || Tokyo, Japan || Ext.R Decision (Split)  || 4 || 3:00
|-  bgcolor="#cfc"
| 2020-12-27|| Win ||align=left| Tomo Kiire || Japan Kickboxing Innovation Champions Carnival 2020 || Tokyo, Japan || KO (Punches) || 3 || 1:42
|-  bgcolor="#cfc"
| 2020-11-08|| Win ||align=left| Masaya Kubo ||REBELS 67 || Tokyo, Japan || Decision (Unanimous) || 3 || 3:00
|-  bgcolor="#fbb"
| 2020-02-11|| Loss ||align=left| Chihiro Suzuki ||KNOCK OUT CHAMPIONSHIP.1, -64kg Grand Prix Quarter Finals || Tokyo, Japan || Decision (Majority) || 3 || 3:00
|-  bgcolor="#cfc"
| 2019-12-08||Win ||align=left| Tatsuya Inaishi || SNKA SOUL IN THE RING CLIMAX || Tokyo, Japan || Decision (Majority) || 3 || 3:00
|-  bgcolor="#cfc"
| 2019-10-06||Win ||align=left| Tereka∞ || REBELS 63×KNOCK OUT || Tokyo, Japan || Decision (Unanimous) || 3 || 3:00
|-  bgcolor="#cfc"
| 2019-08-18||Win ||align=left| Johnny Oliveira || K.O CLIMAX 2019: Summer Kick Fever || Tokyo, Japan || Decision (Unanimous) || 3 || 3:00
|-  bgcolor="#cfc"
| 2019-07-15||Win ||align=left| Volcano Imoto || Japanese Kickboxing Innovation Join Forces 14 || Tokyo, Japan || KO (Middle kick) || 1 || 2:30
|-  bgcolor="#cfc"
| 2019-06-09||Win ||align=left| Yoshiki|| REBELS 61 || Tokyo, Japan || Decision (Split) || 3 || 3:00
|-  bgcolor="#cfc"
| 2019-05-19||Win ||align=left| Tatsuro Fukui || Japanese Kickboxing Innovation Join Forces 13 || Tokyo, Japan || TKO (Doctor Stoppage) || 1 || 3:00
|-  bgcolor="#cfc"
| 2019-03-31||Win ||align=left| Masahiro Kojika || Japanese Kickboxing Innovation Join Forces 12 || Tokyo, Japan || TKO (3 Knockdowns) || 2 || 2:38
|-
| colspan=9 | Legend:

See also
 List of male kickboxers

References

Living people
1997 births
Japanese male kickboxers
Sportspeople from Ibaraki Prefecture
Kyokushin kaikan practitioners
21st-century Japanese people